Timeline of Washington history may refer to:

 Timeline of Washington (state) history
 Timeline of Washington, D.C., history